Helen MacGrgeor Todd (April 1, 1870 – August 15, 1953) was an American suffragist and worker's rights activist. Todd started her career as an educator and later became a factory inspector. She wrote about child laborers in factories and became concerned with working women's lack of voting rights. Todd campaigned for women's suffrage across the United States and was an envoy on the Suffrage Special. After women won the right to vote, she continued to advocate for immigrants, workers and women.

Biography 
Early in Todd's career, she worked as a teacher in Chicago. She became involved with Hull House and went into social work. Eventually, she became an Illinois state factory inspector. During her time as an inspector, she studied child laborers and their attitudes about working and education. She interviewed 800 children who worked in factories and published her findings in the April 1913 edition of McClure's Magazine. She was also concerned about women workers and the fact that they had no power because they could not vote. This led to Todd's interest in the woman's suffrage movement.

In 1910, she took part in an automobile tour to support women's suffrage where she and others spoke to factory workers. Around 1911, she helped popularize the labor movement slogan, "bread and roses." Also in 1911, she went to San Francisco to speak on the topic of suffrage and working women and children. Women in San Francisco asked her to stay on to help organize and support the effort to encourage women to vote in California. Todd asked women in California to use their right to vote in order to help make life better for workers, especially women workers.
Todd went on to help in other states to win women's suffrage, but eventually came to feel that an amendment for national women's suffrage was critical. In 1913, she testified in front of the House of Representatives on women's suffrage. She spoke with men in New York, urging them to support women's right to vote in 1915. In 1916 she was an envoy for the state of New York on the Suffrage Special, which toured the United States encouraging support for national women's suffrage. When the Silent Sentinels were arrested and mistreated in prison, Todd worked to look into the abuses they faced. She represented the Committee of 1,000 Women who urged their release.

After women gained the right to vote, Todd continued advocating for women and workers. In 1920, she created a "Woman to Woman" committee which would bring working and immigrant women into dialogue with American women. When Russian communists were deported, she worked to help the 100 children and wives of these men. Todd also campaigned for women's right to learn about birth control, working with Margaret Sanger. She helped create low-cost housing called Twin Oaks in Greenwich Village for artists, working with Otto H. Kahn and Samuel Untermyer.

Todd died on August 15, 1953 at Columbus Hospital in New York.

References 

1870 births
1953 deaths
American social workers
American suffragists
Educators from Illinois
American women educators
Factory inspectors